This is the discography of American R&B group All-4-One. Since 1994, the band have released seven studio albums, one greatest hits compilation album, two live albums and one holiday album.

Albums

Studio albums

Compilation albums

Live albums

Holiday albums

Singles

Other appearances

Music videos

References

Contemporary R&B discographies
Discographies of American artists